Diablero is a Mexican television web series produced by Morena Films for Netflix. The series is based on the book by Mexican writer Francisco Haghenbeck entitled El Diablo me obligó. The series premiered on 21 December 2018. The series was renewed for a second season in February 2019 which premiered on January 31, 2020.

The series was canceled after two seasons.

Plot 
The story revolves around Father Ramiro Ventura, a priest who seeks the help of the legendary demon hunter or "Diablero" Elvis Infante. With the help of Elvis's sister Keta and demon possessed Nancy Gama this unlikely team unleashes a series of events that could determine the fate of humanity.

Cast 
 Horacio García Rojas as Heliodoro "Elvis" Infante, a diablero
 Christopher von Uckermann as Father Ramiro Ventura
 Gisselle Kuri as Nancy Gama
 Fátima Molina as Enriqueta "Keta" Infante
 Dolores Heredia as Mamá Chabela 
 Humberto Busto as Isaac 'El Indio' 
 Mariana Botas as Thalia
 Dulce Neri as Paulina
 Flavio Medina as Cardinal Morelo
 Gerardo Taracena as Benito Infante
 Quetzalli Cortés as Wences 
 Cassandra Iturralde as Mariana
 Ela Velden as Lupe Reyna
 Michel Duval as Alejandro / Tepoz / Ahuizotl

Episodes

Season 1 (2018)

Season 2 (2020)

References 

2018 Mexican television series debuts
2020 Mexican television seasons
2020 Mexican television series endings
Spanish-language Netflix original programming
Supernatural television series
Horror fiction television series